The Motor Vehicles Act, 1988   The Act came into force from 1 July 1989. It replaced Motor Vehicles Act, 1939 which earlier replaced the first such enactment Motor Vehicles Act, 1914.

 The act is amended by The Motor Vehicles (Amendment) act, 2019. The Act provides in detail the legislative provisions regarding licensing of drivers/conductors, registration of motor vehicles, control of motor vehicles through permits, special provisions relating to state transport undertakings, traffic regulation, insurance, liability, offences and penalties, etc. For exercising the legislative provisions of the Act, the Government of India made the Central Motor Vehicles Rules 1989.

Definitions
Some of the definitions from the act are given below:
Motor vehicle: Any mechanically propelled vehicle adapted for use upon roads whether the power of propulsion is transmitted from an external or internal source of power. The Motor Vehicles Act, 1988, like the earlier Act of 1939, makes the insurance of motor vehicles compulsory. The owner of every motor vehicle is bound to insure his vehicle against third party risk. The insurance company, i.e, the insurer covers risk of loss to the third party by the use of the motor vehicle.

Accident claims
There is a provision to provide  with no upper 
limit,  as interim relief to the family of a victim of fatal accidents. The cases of road accident compensation claims are decided in the Motor Accident Claims Tribunal.

Previous laws
The "Indian Motor Vehicles Act, 1914" was a central legislation passed and applicable in British India. Some princely states followed suit, with local modifications. Motor vehicles were first introduced in India towards the end of the 19th century, and the 1914 Act was the first legislation to regulate their use. It had 18 sections, and gave local governments the responsibility of registering and licensing vehicles and motorists, and enforcing regulations. It was replaced by the Motor Vehicles Act, 1939, which came into force in 1940.

Amendments

Indian Motor Vehicles Acts, from 1914-2016 
The "Indian Motor Vehicles Act, 1914" was amended by the "Indian Motor Vehicles (Amendment) Act, 1920" (Act No. XXVII of 1920) passed by the Imperial Legislative Council. It received assent from the Governor General of India on 2 September 1920. The Act amended sections 11 and 18 of the 1914 Act.

The Act was amended again by the "Indian Motor Vehicles (Amendment) Act, 1924" (Act No. XV of 1924). The Act received assent from the Governor General on 18 September 1924. It had the title, "An Act further to amend the Indian Motor Vehicles Act, 1914, for certain purposes" and amended section 11 of the 1914 Act by inserting the words "and the duration for which" after the words "area in which" in clause (a) of subsection (2) of section 11. The motor vehicle act has again been amended in 2016.

Indian Motor Vehicles (Amendment) Act, 2017 
This will be a significant upgrade to the motor vehicle laws. It envisages body cams on traffic cops and RTO officials to check corruption and 7-year imprisonment instead of current 2 years for drink-driving deaths, mandatory 3rd party insurance for all vehicles, and stiffer penalties for traffic violations to reduce the accident rates.

However due to frequent disruptions in Rajya Sabha and lack of support from Indian National Congress, the bill failed to turn into act and lapsed after the conclusion of interim budget session and on the account of general elections.

Indian Motor Vehicles (Amendment) Act, 2019 
Motor Vehicles amendment Act came in to force on 1 September 2019, providing higher penalties for traffic offences.

References

External links
Full text of the Motor Vehicle Act, 1988
Full text of the 1920 amendment (Page 166)
Full text of the 1924 amendment (Page 211)

Acts of the Parliament of India 1988
Road transport in India
History of transport in India
Transport legislation
1988 in transport